Ancistrocladus letestui is a species of liana of the plant family of the Ancistrocladaceae occurring in the subtropical or tropical dry forests of Cameroon, Congo-Brazzaville, Zaire, and Gabon. It is threatened by habitat loss.

References

External links
 View occurrences of Ancistrocladus letestui in the Biodiversity Heritage Library.

Ancistrocladaceae
Vulnerable plants
Flora of West-Central Tropical Africa
Plants described in 1951
Taxonomy articles created by Polbot
Taxa named by François Pellegrin